Karim Konaté (born 21 March 2004) is an Ivorian professional footballer who plays as a forward for RB Salzburg and the Ivory Coast national team.

Club career
A youth product of ASEC Mimosas, Konaté began his senior career with the club in 2020. He scored 7 goals in 18 matches in his debut season. For the 2022/23 season he went to FC Red Bull Salzburg. There he was loaned to FC Liefering.

International career
Konaté debuted with the Ivory Coast national team in a 0–0 2022 FIFA World Cup qualification tie with Mozambique on 3 March 2021.

Honours 
ASEC Mimosas
Ligue 1 (Ivory Coast): 2020–21

References

External links

2004 births
Living people
Footballers from Abidjan
Ivorian footballers
Ivory Coast international footballers
Association football forwards
ASEC Mimosas players
Ligue 1 (Ivory Coast) players